"In The Summer" is the third single by English electronic band Crystal Fighters from their album Star of Love. The single was released on 5 July 2010 through Zirkulo records to positive reviews.

Release
This single was named by the BBCs Nick Grimshaw as one of his "Records of the Week". "In The Summer" received wide radio coverage, being played by Rob da Bank and Zane Lowe; being featured as a record to "Go buy Monday" by Dermot O'Leary; and even featuring as one of Huw Stephens' "Hottest records in the world".

Music video
The video was directed by Tobias Stretch and filmed in the Appalachian Mountains.

Track listing

Reception
The single was well reviewed by music magazine The Fly who awarded the single 4 (out of 5) flies with the following review:

Charts

References

2010 singles
Crystal Fighters songs
2010 songs